Flaviano Vicentini (21 June 1942 – 31 December 2002) was an Italian road race cyclist who was active between 1963 and 1971. After becoming the world champion in 1963 as amateur, he turned professional. He then won the Grand Prix de Cannes in 1966 and the Giro del Lazio in 1969. In 1968 and 1969 he also won one stage at the Volta a Catalunya.

References

1942 births
2002 deaths
Italian male cyclists
Cyclists from the Province of Verona